The Men's scratch competition at the 2018 UCI Track Cycling World Championships was held on 1 March 2018.

Results
The race was started at 19:53.

References

Men's scratch
UCI Track Cycling World Championships – Men's scratch